Kunde is a village in the Khumbu region of Nepal within the Sagarmatha National Park. It is directly adjacent to Khumjung village in the valley at the foot of Khumbu Yül-Lha, the sacred mountain of the Sherpas. The Khumjung-Valley is located between 3800m and 4000m above sea level. Kunde is located in the western part of the valley and slightly higher than Khumjung. It is the site of Kunde Hospital, founded by Sir Edmund Hillary in 1966. Kunde is located less than 25 km away from Mount Everest and is situated in the Himalayas near the Nepal/China border.

References 

Populated places in Solukhumbu District
Himalayas
Khumbu Pasanglhamu